K18 may refer to:
 K-18 (Kansas highway)
 Keratin 18
 Symphony No. 3 (Mozart), once attributed to Wolfgang Amadeus Mozart